David G. Chardavoyne (born September 10, 1948) is an American attorney, professor, and author of several works on the legal history of Michigan. His first book (published in 2003) A Hanging in Detroit: Stephen Gifford Simmons and the Last Execution Under Michigan Law. The book is a historical account of Stephen G. Simmons, a fifty-year-old tavern keeper and farmer, who, in September 1830, was hanged in Detroit for murdering his wife, Levana Simmons, in a drunken, jealous rage. Simmons was the second and last person to be executed under Michigan law. The book also chronicles Michigan's abolition of capital punishment in 1846, making it the first government in the world to do so. Chardavoyne contributed a chapter on the Territory of Michigan to The History of Michigan Law, published in 2006. Both books were recognized as Michigan Notable Books. In 2012, Chardavoyne's second full book appeared, a history of eastern Michigan's federal district court from its creation in 1837 to 2010--The United States District Court for the Eastern District of Michigan: People, Law and Politics.

Born in Ohio, Chardavoyne lived for six years in Geneva, Switzerland where he attended the International School of Geneva. Returning to the U.S. in 1964, he graduated from Kennett Square (PA) Consolidated High School (1966) and from the University of Michigan (B.A., English, 1970). After serving in the U.S. Army Airborne in Germany, he graduated magna cum laude from Wayne State University Law School in 1976. He was a partner in one of Detroit's top law firms for 20 years until he left to teach and write. He now teaches at Wayne State University Law School and the University of Detroit Mercy School of Law, and continues to write.

References

American legal scholars
American legal writers
Living people
Michigan lawyers
Writers from Michigan
1948 births
University of Michigan College of Literature, Science, and the Arts alumni
Wayne State University alumni
Wayne State University faculty
University of Detroit Mercy faculty
International School of Geneva alumni